Alberto Marco Giovanni Ghibellini (born 12 June 1973) is an Italian water polo player. He competed in the 1996 Summer Olympics, where the team won bronze, and in the 2000 Summer Olympics, where the team placed 5th. Ghibellini was born in Genoa.

See also
 Italy men's Olympic water polo team records and statistics
 List of Olympic medalists in water polo (men)

References

External links
 

1973 births
Living people
Italian male water polo players
Olympic water polo players of Italy
Water polo players at the 1996 Summer Olympics
Water polo players at the 2000 Summer Olympics
Olympic bronze medalists for Italy
Olympic medalists in water polo
Medalists at the 1996 Summer Olympics
Water polo players from Genoa